Wenzel Bernhard Ambrozy (2 July 1723 – 26 April 1806) was a Czech painter.

Ambrozy, who was born at Kuttenberg, in Bohemia, in 1723, received instruction in art at Prague from his brother Joseph, who was a miniature painter. He was court painter to Maria Theresa, and the last president of the Painters' Guild at Prague. He painted portraits and altar-pieces in oil, but was also famous for his frescoes, which adorn many of the churches and castles of Prague, and other places in Bohemia. He died in 1806.

References 
 

1723 births
1806 deaths
People from Kutná Hora
People from the Kingdom of Bohemia
18th-century Austrian painters
18th-century Austrian male artists
Czech male painters
Czech expatriates in Austria
Fresco painters
18th-century Bohemian painters
18th-century male artists